Deliosman, also known as Koçanlı, is a village in the Kilis District, Kilis Province, Turkey. The village is inhabited by Kurds of the Delikan tribe and had a population of 345 in 2022.

In late 19th century, the village was a settlement with 5 houses, while Koçanlı was a separate settlement with 15 houses, inhabited by Kurds.

References

Villages in Kilis District
Kurdish settlements in Kilis Province